The Shuya is a river in Kostroma Oblast in Russia, a left tributary of the Nyomda (Volga's basin). It freezes up in November and stays icebound until April.

References 

Rivers of Kostroma Oblast